The following is a list of episodes from the Cartoon Network animated series Summer Camp Island. On May 9, 2020, it was announced that the series is moving to HBO Max. The show was removed from HBO Max in August 2022 due to the Warner Bros. Discovery merger, and the show will be moving back to Cartoon Network for the sixth and final season in 2023.

Series overview

Episodes

Precursors (2011–12)
The main Summer Camp Island characters, Oscar, Hedgehog and Max, make their first appearances as incarnations in two of Julia Pott's independent shorts: the first is her multi-awarded student film from Royal College of Art (called Belly), while the second is her Sundance Film Festival 2013-nominated short The Event.

Pilot (2016)

Season 1 (2018–19)

Season 2 (2020)

Season 3 (2020)

Season 4 (2021)

Season 5 (2021)

Season 6 (2023)

References

Lists of American children's animated television series episodes
Lists of Cartoon Network television series episodes